The Philippine National Police Medal of Valor (Filipino: Medalya ng Kagitingan), also called the PNP Medal of Valor is the Philippine National Police's highest honor awarded for "a deed of personal bravery and self-sacrifice above and beyond the call of duty so conspicuous as to distinguish himself clearly above his comrades in the performance of more than ordinary hazardous service."

The medal is awarded by the President of the Philippines to members of the Philippine National Police.

References

Orders, decorations, and medals of the Philippines